Podonosma is a genus of flowering plants belonging to the family Boraginaceae.

Its native range is Eastern Mediterranean to Iran.

Species:

Podonosma galalensis 
Podonosma orientalis 
Podonosma sintenisii

References

Boraginaceae
Boraginaceae genera